Route 134 is a -long north–south secondary highway in eastern New Brunswick, Canada. The highway is divided by into a northern and southern section by a gap in Northumberland County connected by Route 11 and Route 8.

History 
Route 134, for the most part, consists of former routings of Route 8 and Route 11. It was first designated in 1972 with the opening of the Shediac four-lane highway between Moncton and Shediac (now part of Route 15). Different sections of Route 134 continued to appear between the mid-1970s and the early 1990s as construction continued of new controlled-access alignments of Route 8 and Route 11.

As Route 11 between Kouchibouguac and Miramichi, and a stretch of Route 8 south of Allardville have never been upgraded, Route 134 remains a "broken" route.

A third segment of Route 134 appeared briefly on maps in the early 1990s along Oldfield Road north of Miramichi (after a new alignment of Route 8 was constructed), whether it was signed or officially part of the route is uncertain.

Route 134 was rerouted in a portion of Belledune in 1996 after the footprint of a new power plant took over a section of the route's former alignment.

Route

Moncton
The route's southern terminus begins at the intersection of Route 106 in Moncton (Main St) where the route is called Botsford St. The route travels north crossing Route 126 (Mountain Rd), then Route 15 (Wheeler Blvd).  Now known as Lewisville Road, the route crosses Humphrey Brook, passing the southern terminus of Route 115, turning north east and is known as Shediac Rd.  Continuing out of the city crossing under Route 2 as it exits the city passing through Lakeville north east.

Rural Westmorland County
The route continues north-east passing through the community of Shediac Cape in Westmorland County, crossing Route 11 where it takes a sharp turn north at the northern terminus of Route 133.

Kent County

Northumberland County

Gloucester County
As Route 134 enters Gloucester County, it is concurrent with Route 8. After a few kilometres, it splits away and heads NNW to Allardville. After passing through Allardville, intersecting Route 160, it continues for about 25 km heading NNW for Bathurst. After passing through Bathurst and serving as the eastern terminus of Route 180, it goes up the SW coast of Chaleur Bay for about 30 km before hopping into Restigouche County near Belledune.

Restigouche County
In Restigouche County, it continues to run along the Bay of Chaleur. Upon entering from the south, Route 134 follows a short alignment, built around a power plant in Belledune. North of it, the road continues along the coast, running through the communities of Jacquet River, Nash Creek, and New Mills among others, before reaching the Village of Charlo. In the northern part of the village, there is a beach which the route travels through, along the mouth of the Eel River. On the other side of the Eel River, is Eel River Bar First Nation. The road then proceeds through downtown Dalhousie, along Renfrew, William, and George Street's. After a right turn, Route 134 heads west for Campbellton. In the 20 km between the two municipalities, the posted speed limit varies from 60 – 80 km/h. Upon entering Campbellton, the speed limit is reduced to 50 km/h, and a sidewalk appears. The road takes a route through downtown Campbellton, following Ramsay, Water, Andrew, and Roseberry Street's. West of Campbellton are Atholville and Tide Head. Through the villages, it becomes a truck route, linking highways to local industry. At the intersection with Route 11 in Tide Head, Route 134 reaches its northern terminus.

Communities along Route 134

Major intersections

See also
List of New Brunswick provincial highways

References

134
134
134
134
134
Transport in Bathurst, New Brunswick
Transport in Campbellton, New Brunswick
Shediac
Transport in Miramichi, New Brunswick
Transport in Moncton